Valley of the Dead is a 2020 Spanish zombie action film directed by Javier Ruiz Caldera and Alberto de Toro set in the Spanish Civil War. Its cast features Miki Esparbé, Aura Garrido, Luis Callejo, Álvaro Cervantes, Jesús Carroza and María Botto.

Plot 
  
The film is set in 1938, during the latter phases of the Spanish Civil War. A column of SS troops arrive at a small village during a wedding. The SS officer in command takes a toast of the strong alcohol the wedding guests are drinking, but coughs and sputters, causing the guests to laugh at him. Angrily, he orders one of his men to open fire with a machine gun, slaughtering the wedding guests. The SS men then put on gas masks and open numerous canisters containing a strange gas, which float towards the corpses of the villagers. 

Captain Jan Lozano's high ranking uncle arrives just in time to save him from a firing squad. Jan has repeatedly run afoul of the Nationalist government, and it is only through the intervention of his uncle that he has been spared. General Lozano informs his nephew that in return for sparing him, the regime wants Jan to deliver a message to a unit in a dangerous area of the front. Private Decruz, a deserter that Jan had saved, is assigned to be his driver for the mission, which is seen as extremely dangerous. Wounded nationalist soldiers are seen being loaded onto a train manned by the same SS troops from the beginning of the film. Jan and Delacruz choose to take a shortcut through a valley contested between the two sides, only to stumble upon a roadblock manned by additional Germans. A German officer attempts to prevent them from passing through the area, but Jan subtlety threatens him into letting them through. As they pass through the valley, Jan and Decruz watch as an Italian Fiat fighter is shot down by a Soviet Polikarpov fighter; spotting a parachute from the downed Italian aircraft, Jan decides to take a detour to rescue the pilot, to Decruz' dismay. While searching, they stumble across barrels labeled with the insignia of the SS unit from the film's opening. They soon after reach a clearing, discovering the mangled corpse of the Italian pilot. Before they can return to their mission, a group of Republican soldiers emerge from the forest and capture Jan and Decruz. 

The Republicans search Jan, discovering that the message he'd been ordered to deliver is meaningless. The Republicans threaten to execute Decruz, but Jan lies and claims he has a wife and two kids; the Republicans decide not kill him, and decide to take both men prisoner instead. The Republican unit's photographer hangs back to take a photo of the corpse of the Italian pilot, only for the dead man to suddenly reanimate and kill him. Two of the Republican soldiers, Brodsky and Mecha, rush to intervene, physically hurling the corpse away. The zombie immediately goes on the attack, however, rapidly crawling towards Brodsky, who riddles it with submachine gun fire to no effect. Just as it is about to bite him, the unit's sergeant kills it with a shot from his revolver. The corpse of the photographer then gets back up, shocking Mecha, who had checked and was sure he was dead. It attempts to attack the group, but is swiftly dispatched. The group leaves the area, spotting Junkers bombers passing overhead as they move.

The group hears sounds of explosions coming from the Republican camp, discovering it in ruins. The group discovers the corpses of the Republican soldiers left in the camp have begun reanimating. Carlos, one of the Republican soldiers, sees his father amongs the reanimated Republicans, and attempts to greet him, only to be attacked and killed. The Republican soldiers open fire as the rest of the zombies attack them; Jan notices that the zombies have to be hit in the head to be killed. That knowledge helps the group escape, making their way to a nearby boat. They travel along the river, heading for another Republican base in the area. Once they make landfall, they are attacked by another group of zombies; Brodsky is killed as the group continues to flee. The group makes it to a small cabin, only to find it occupied by a pair of Nationalist soldiers--Jurell and Rafir-- and a nun, Sister Flor. A standoff ensues, which Jan manages to defuse, convincing the two sides to call a truce. The Nationalist soldiers reveal that they were accidentally attacked by a Junkers aircraft, which killed most of the patrol, and the reanimated dead promptly attacked them. They fled, meeting up with Sister Flor, and the group had made it to the base. 

The group spends the night discussing what is going on, their previous lives, and the state of the war. They then discover a large group of zombies are approaching. The group flees out the back as the zombies swarm the base; Mecha uses a bundle of dynamite to cover their retreat. The group discovers a large, electrified barbed wire fence, and it becomes clear that the SS had fenced off the entire area. There are a number of zombies caught in the fence, one of them being the reanimated corpse of Brodsky, which the Sergeant then kills. It is revealed that the note Jan's uncle gave him has a secret map on it written in invisible ink. The group decides to investigate the base area at the center of the map. 

The base is revealed to be the ruins of the village wiped out by the SS at the beginning of the film. While investigating, they discover a lone survivor--Ana, the bride. She reveals that her husband fell on top of her and his body protected her from the bullets. She states that the SS had taken over the town and used it to conduct various experiments until an accident occurred, leading to the SS unit being wiped out by additional zombies. Jaime, the Republican unit's commissar, searches the church while Ana is telling her story, and discovers the formula the Germans were using; he plans to bring it back so that the Republic can unleash it on Nationalist held cities and win the war. The other Republican soldiers protest, and a standoff ensues; Jaime takes Decruz prisoner as he slowly backs away, berating the other Republicans. As he continues to step back, he is suddenly swarmed and killed by a large group of zombies. The reanimated corpses begin trying to break into the church, and the group flees via a set of tunnels. As they flee down the tunnel, Jurrell helps carry Ana along; she is revealed to have been infected, and attacks him. During the ensuing fight, Rafir is seemingly bitten, but Ana's teeth fail to penetrate his boot. After dispatching Ana, the group continues fleeing; Sister Flor stays behind, revealing that she had been bitten. She holds the attacking zombies off for as long as possible before dying.  

Jan advocates going to the town of Las Aguilas in hopes of stopping the plague, revealing that his brother is fighting for the Republicans. He convinces the group to go along with the plan, and they travel to the base. Jan's uncle and a German officer are at the base, and Jan's uncle reveals he knew full well what was going on, and that the Soviets are working on a similar bioweapon. Jan refuses to leave the rest of the men behind, and leaves to rejoin the group. Jan's uncle is murdered by the SS when he tries to delay a bombing raid on the valley. Decruz reveals he was bitten while retrieving the truck and volunteers to sacrifice himself, managing to blast a hole in the roadblock to allow the group to enter the base. 

Jurrell deserts the group inside the base; and Mecha takes off on a motorcycle. It is revealed that a large group of zombies have followed the group through the tunnels into the base, and they begin slaughtering the Nationalist and German soldiers defending the base. The group continues making their way through the area, searching for a train car where the SS had set up their laboratory. Rafir climbs on top of a train car and provides sniper support for the group; he also saves Jurrell, who has become surrounded and cut off. Rafir is suddenly attacked from behind and seemingly killed; Jurrell and Mecha take cover in a truck, surrounded by a large horde of zombies. They discover a large crate in the back of the vehicle continuing explosives, and Mecha reveals he had a single stick of dynamite left. They sacrifice themselves, killing many zombies in the ensuing explosion. 

The group storms the train car laboratory, encountering the SS commander, who declares there is no antidote. Matacuras shoots the SS officer, only for Jan to be bitten on the hand by a zombie. She proceeds to immediately cut off his hand, preventing him from becoming fully infected. The Sergeant manages to get the train moving, although he shoots himself as a large group of zombies close in on him. The train, however, successfully escape the base as a group of German bombers arrive and begin pummeling the valley. Jan and Matacuras share a kiss as the bombs rain down. Rafir, on top of the train, is revealed to have managed to dispatch the zombie which had attacked him and have survived as well. Matacuras brings Jan back to the edge of fascist lines, and she tells him her intention to slip over the border into France, the war having been lost. They say their farewells and go their separate ways. 

In a post-credits scene, a gloved hand moves amongst the wreckage on the train and a guttural scream can be heard, indicating that one of the zombies may have survived as well.

Cast

Production 
Malnazidos is an adaptation of the novel Noche de difuntos del 38 by Manuel Martín Ferreras. The film was produced by Telecinco Cinema, Cactus Flower Producciones, Malnazidos AIE, La Terraza Films and Ikiru Films. It was co-directed by Javier Ruiz Caldera and Alberto de Toro whereas the screenplay was written by Jaime Marqués Olarreaga, Alberto Fernández Arregui and Cristian Conti. Ghislain Barrois, Álvaro Augustin, Cristian Conti, Javier Ugarte and Edmon Rochare were credited as producers. Shooting took place in Catalonia.

Release 
The film premiered on 8 October 2020, at the 53rd Sitges Film Festival (FICFC). 

Initially intended to be theatrically released in Spain on 22 January 2021, the release was postponed to 24 September 2021 due to the COVID-19 pandemic, which caused the shelving of all Telecinco Cinema titles pending for theatrical release. Postponed again, its release was eventually re-scheduled for 11 March 2022.

Accolades 

|-
| rowspan = "4" align = "center" | 2023 
| rowspan = "2" | 15th Gaudí Awards || Best Visual Effects || Lluís Rivera, Laura Pedro ||  || rowspan = "2" | 
|-
| Best Makeup and Hairstyles || Montse Sanfeliu, Jesús Martos || 
|-
| rowspan = "2" | 37th Goya Awards
| Best Costume Design
| Cristina Rodríguez
| 
| rowspan = "2" align = "center" | 
|-
| Best Special Effects || Lluís Rivera, Laura Pedro || 
|}

See also 
 List of Spanish films of 2022

References

External links
 

2020 films
Spanish zombie films
Spanish action films
Spanish Civil War films
Films based on Spanish novels
Films set in 1938
Films shot in Spain
2020s Spanish-language films
2020 action films
Telecinco Cinema films
Ikiru Films films
2020s Spanish films